"Lusin" (English: "Moon") is a song by Armenian musicians Garik Papoyan and Sona Rubenyan. The song was released for digital download on iTunes as a single on 13 November 2017. However, the song's live performance was uploaded on YouTube on October 27. The song is written by another Armenian musician Edgar Elbakyan. The song was named the hit of the year at the 2018 Swallow Music Awards. The song was also named the best track of December month at the Van Music Awards.

Credits and personnel
Credits adapted from YouTube.

 Garik Papoyan – production, arrangements
 Sona Rubenyan – vocals
 David Gevorgyan – drums
 David Paronikyan - percussion

Awards

See also 
 LoveWave

References

2017 singles
2017 songs
Armenian songs